Megachile nigriventris is a species of bee in the family Megachilidae. It was described by Schenck in 1870.

References

Nigriventris
Insects described in 1870